Hanzhong Chenggu Airport , or Chenggu Air Base, is a dual-use military and civil airport serving the city of Hanzhong in Shaanxi province, China.  Located in Chenggu County northeast of Hanzhong, it replaced the old Hanzhong Xiguan Airport, which could not be expanded due to its proximity to the city center.  Construction commenced in late December 2011 with an estimated total investment of 580 million yuan, and the airport was opened on 13 August 2014.

Facilities
The expansion project includes a new runway that is 2,500 meters long and 45 meters wide, and a 5,000 square-meter terminal building.  The airport is designed to handle 300,000 passengers and 1,300 tons of cargo annually by 2020.

Airlines and destinations

See also
List of airports in China
List of the busiest airports in China
List of People's Liberation Army Air Force airbases

References

Airports in Shaanxi
Chinese Air Force bases
Airports established in 2014
Hanzhong
2014 establishments in China